Charles Richard Cuffe (5 August 1914 – 10 November 1972) was an Irish cricketer. A left-handed batsman and wicket-keeper, he made his debut for the Ireland cricket team against the MCC in August 1936 and went on to play for them on 14 occasions, his last match coming against Sir Julien Cahn's XI in August 1939. Three of his matches for Ireland had first-class status.

References

1914 births
1972 deaths
Irish cricketers
Cricketers from Dublin (city)
Wicket-keepers